The 1906 UCI Track Cycling World Championships were the World Championship for track cycling. They took place in Geneve, Switzerland from 29 July to 5 August 1906. Four events for men were contested, two for professionals and two for amateurs.

Medal summary

Medal table

References

Track cycling
UCI Track Cycling World Championships by year
International cycle races hosted by Switzerland
Sports competitions in Geneva
1906 in track cycling